Camilla Indset Sørgjerd (born 25 October 1978) is a Norwegian professional racing cyclist. She won the Norwegian National Road Race Championship in 2014.

References

External links

1978 births
Living people
Norwegian female cyclists
Place of birth missing (living people)